Mystery Man may refer to:

"Mystery Man", a song on Play Deep, the 1985 debut album released by British band The Outfield
"Mystery Man", a song on Tom Petty and the Heartbreakers, the 1976 debut album by the band of the same name
"Mystery Man", a 2009 episode of the American TV series Cougar Town
"Mystery Man", an episode of the television series The Crown
The Mystery Man, the fifth solo album by jazz pianist Mike Garson, released in 1990
The Mystery Man (film), a 1935 American film directed by Ray McCarey
Mystery Man (film), a 1944 Hopalong Cassidy Western directed by George Archainbaud
W.D. Gaster (possible in-game sprite named "spr_mysteryman"), a character and mystery from the video game Undertale